HCSA - the hospital doctors' union (Hospital Consultants and Specialists Association) is a nationally recognised professional association and trade union in the UK dedicated solely to hospital consultants, specialty doctors and core/specialty hospital doctors in training and Foundation grades ("junior doctors"), originally established in 1948 as the Regional Hospital Consultants and Specialists Association.

Medical Students can also join as associates.

It was granted national collective bargaining rights for all grades of hospital doctors in England by NHS Employers on 22 December 2016. This is the first time any trade union for doctors other than the British Medical Association has been nationally recognised by the NHS.

In 1974 the association's rules were amended to extend membership rights to all senior hospital doctors, and its members voted for a new name, the Hospital Consultants and Specialists Association, to reflect this change.

HCSA has been affiliated to the Trades Union Congress (TUC) since 1979. It is also affiliated to the General Federation of Trade Unions (UK).

The association has admitted hospital specialty doctors in training ("junior doctors") since a rule change announced on 1 May 2013.

On 28 April 2017 members voted for a rule change that extended membership further to encompass all post-graduate hospital doctors, including Foundation grades for the first time.

On 25 June 2013 HCSA attended is first meeting of the NHS Staff Council, a body containing representatives of staff-side unions and NHS employers.

In April 2018, the HCSA AGM endorsed Dr Claudia Paoloni as President-elect. When she took up her post in 2019 she became the first ever woman President in the association's history.

The association publishes a bi-monthly magazine for members, Hospital Consultant & Specialist.

Organisational structure
Every four years HCSA members elect members to the ruling Council, with representation based on relevant Constituencies as determined by the Council, which meets every six months. Currently there are 13 geographical constituencies, each with the right to elect up to four representatives to the Council. Day-to-day decisions are made by a standing committee, known as the Executive, which meets regularly and is drawn from Council members who are appointed to National Officer roles.

The Executive's current membership comprises:
 President Dr Naru Narayanan, FRCOG
 Chair of the Executive Dr Bernhard Heidemann, FRCA
 Immediate Past President Dr Claudia Paoloni, FRCA
 Honorary Treasurer Dr Patrick McGowan, FRCA
 Honorary Secretary Dr Sarah Tennant
 Honorary Secretary Dr Emma Cox
 Honorary Secretary Mr Harish Parmar, FRCS
 Honorary Secretary Dr John West, MD FRCP
 Independent Healthcare Matters Mr Christopher Khoo, FRCS

In addition, HCSA is represented at the TUC and within the NHS Staff Council by its general secretary:

 General Secretary Dr Paul Donaldson

2014-15 NHS pay dispute
On 28 July 2014 a consultative ballot of HCSA members was announced over the government's decision to ignore a Review Body on Doctors' and Dentists' Remuneration (DDRB) recommendation of a 1 per cent pay rise for all NHS staff.

An extraordinary meeting of the HCSA executive met to consider the results of the ballot, which closed on 18 August 2014, after 80 per cent of those voting backed some form of industrial action. The executive subsequently voted to hold a formal ballot on industrial action.

In the wake of the consultative ballot results HCSA President Professor John Schofield said: "Doctors have only very rarely indicated any willingness to undertake industrial action, and it demonstrates the strength of feeling within our profession. We will continue to listen to our members and represent their views to NHS Employers. I hope that we can encourage further dialogue between the government, employers and unions to avoid the possibility of action.”

HCSA members mounted industrial action in the form of "work to rule" alongside other health unions in October 2014.

2015 Consultants' Contract
On 16 July 2015 the DDRB published its recommendations following an independent review of the Consultants' Contract and the Doctors in Training Contract.

In the wake of the report, on 30 July 2015, HCSA stated its position In Favour of A Safe Seven-Day Service, highlighting the need for the principles of safety, fairness and work-life balance to be maintained in any changes.

2015 Junior Doctors Dispute
On 5 October 2015, then HCSA General Secretary Eddie Saville set out the association's position calling for A Fair Deal for Doctors In Training.

Explaining the HCSA position, he said: "As with our position on the consultant aspect of the DDRB proposals currently being pursued by the government and employers, this stance is guided by the principle that any successful outcome must balance safety, fairness and work-life balance. It must also meet the recruitment and retention test needed to ensure that the health service remains properly staffed. What's more any attempt to impose contractual changes on doctors in training is completely unacceptable, flying in the face of the basic tenets of trade unionism - that negotiation not imposition is the way to bring about a positive outcome that delivers for trainee doctors, patients and the health service as a whole."

References

External links

 

Basingstoke
Healthcare trade unions in the United Kingdom
Organisations based in Hampshire
Professional associations based in the United Kingdom
Trade unions established in 1948
1948 establishments in the United Kingdom
Trade unions based in Hampshire
Trade unions affiliated with the Trades Union Congress